Karpatiosorbus latifolia (the broad-leaved whitebeam or service tree of Fontainebleau; French: alisier de Fontainebleau) is a species of whitebeam that is endemic to the area around Fontainebleau, south of Paris in France, where it has been known since the early eighteenth century.

Description
It is a medium-sized deciduous tree that grows to between ten and twenty metres tall, with a trunk up to sixty centimetres in diameter. The leaves are five to ten centimetres long and broad (rarely, up to 20 cm long and 12 cm broad), but, most typically, the leaves are approximately as broad as they are long. (Latifolia is the Latin word for 'broad-leaved'.)  They are green above, downy with greyish-white hairs beneath, with six to ten small triangular teeth along each margin. The flowers are between one centimetre and 1.5 centimetres in diameter, with five creamy-white petals and yellowish stamens; they are produced in corymbs about eight centimetres in diameter in mid-spring. The fruit is a globular, dull brownish-red, pome of ten to twelve millimetres diameter, dotted with large pale lenticels, ripening in late autumn.

Taxonomy
The tree is of hybrid origin, between Sorbus torminalis (wild service tree) and a member of the Sorbus aria (whitebeam) group, but it exhibits apomixis and breeds true from seed.

It was at one time thought to be a variety of Sorbus intermedia (Swedish whitebeam), and it was treated as such by some authors, such as A. P. de Candolle and J. C. Loudon, during the nineteenth century. Meanwhile, the horticulturalist, George Loddiges, whom Loudon held in high regard, labelled his arboretum trees at Abney Park Cemetery in 1840, as Sorbus latifolia, the currently-accepted binomial. Reflecting the considerable difference in opinion over the past two centuries as to its origins and identity, many synonyms have been used for the tree, including Crataegus latifolia Lam.; Pyrus latifolia (Lam.) Lindl.; P. intermedia var. latifolia (Lam.) D.C., and P. edulis Willd. It is now placed in Karpatiosorbus.

Cultivation and uses
The service tree of Fontainebleau has occasionally been planted in ornamental contexts, or in arboretum schemes of woodland planting, or in gardens and parks, throughout Europe and North America, since its introduction into European horticulture about 1750. Since it is very fertile and grows true from seed, it has occasionally been able to naturalise in woodlands beyond its origins in the protected Fontainebleau woods, as at Abney Park Cemetery (an early Victorian garden cemetery in Stoke Newington, London).

Although it is rare, the tree has been noted for several commercial uses. Its edible fruit was sold in open-air markets at Fontainebleau until the 1950s, and its homogeneous and long-lasting wood has proved to be valuable for certain uses.

The ancient woodlands where it occurs are under the protection of France's Office National des Forêts.

References

latifolia